"Somewhere in the Night" is a song originally recorded by The Oak Ridge Boys on their 1981 album Fancy Free.  The song was later recorded by American country music group Sawyer Brown.  It was released in August 1987 as the first single and title track from the album Somewhere in the Night.  The song reached #29 on the Billboard Hot Country Singles & Tracks chart.  The song was written by Rafe Van Hoy and Don Cook.

Chart performance

References

Songs about nights
1987 singles
1981 songs
The Oak Ridge Boys songs
Sawyer Brown songs
Songs written by Don Cook
Songs written by Rafe Van Hoy
Song recordings produced by Ron Chancey
Capitol Records singles
Curb Records singles